Paulo Henrique may refer to:

Footballers
Paulo Henrique Filho (1965-2017), Brazilian football striker
Paulo Henrique (footballer, born 1943), Brazilian footballer
Paulo Henrique (footballer, born 1972), Brazilian midfielder
Paulo Henrique (footballer, born March 1989), Brazilian football striker
Paulo Henrique (footballer, born September 1989), Brazilian football right-back
Paulo Henrique (footballer, born 1991), Brazilian forward
Paulo Henrique (footballer, born 1993), Brazilian left-back
Paulo Henrique (Portuguese footballer) (born 1996), Portuguese football left-back
Paulo Henrique (footballer, born July 1996), Brazilian football right-back

Other 
Paulo Henrique (choreographer) (born 1968), Portuguese choreographer
Paulo Costa (fighter)  (Paulo Henrique Costa, born 1991), Brazilian mixed martial artist